Zhvandūn (ژوندون, Life in Pashto) was a popular 20th century Afghan cultural and current affairs magazine that ran from 1949 to 1996.

History
The magazine was founded in May 1949 and was published in both Persian and Pashto. The content of the magazine changed according to the political environment. In the 1960s and 70s, advertisements for consumer goods like tape recorders and fridges started becoming prevalent. The writers and readership were urban elites, mainly in Kabul. In the 1980s, under a leftist government, revolutionary and agricultural themes replaced consumerist ones and Soviet film stars replaced those from Hollywood. It ended its run in 1996 during the Mujahideen government.

References

External links
 Zhvandūn editions from 1972 to 1982 digitized by the Library of Congress

1949 establishments in Afghanistan
1996 disestablishments in Afghanistan
Magazines published in Afghanistan
News magazines published in Asia
Biweekly magazines
Magazines established in 1949
Magazines disestablished in 1996
Mass media in Kabul
Pashto-language magazines
Persian-language magazines
Weekly magazines